Knott End-on-Sea is a village in Lancashire, England, on the southern side of Morecambe Bay, across the Wyre estuary from Fleetwood.  Knott End has a pub, the Bourne Arms, county library and golf club. Buses run regularly from Knott End and there is also a three-minute ferry crossing to Fleetwood.

Knott End also has two clubs, The Squash and Knott End Working Men's Club.

See also
Knott End Railway
Knott End-on-Sea railway station

External links

 Preesall Town Council
 Wyre Borough Council
 Lancashire County Council
 Local Information
 Over-Wyre and Knott End History and Topography
 L S Lowry in Knott End
 Seeing the Isle of Man from Knott End
 Novels set in Knott End
 Visit Poulton-le-Fylde, local photos and video

Villages in Lancashire
Geography of the Borough of Wyre
The Fylde
Populated coastal places in Lancashire
Morecambe Bay